Tony Football Club is a football club based in Margibi County, Liberia.

As of the 2021–22 season, the team competes in the Liberian Second Division. In 2022, the club reached the final of the Liberian FA Cup, losing in a penalty shoot-out to LISCR FC following a 2–2 draw.

Notable players 
  Frederick Dennis

References 

Football clubs in Liberia
Margibi County